"Yo-Yo" is a song recorded by the Danish singer Joey Moe. This song was the break-through song for Joey, and after just a few weeks it was the most downloaded song on iTunes. It is the most played song in Danish clubs and the longest reigning number one on the Danish dance chart.

Danish pop songs
2009 singles
2009 songs